{{DISPLAYTITLE:C12H16F3N}}
The molecular formula C12H16F3N (molar mass: 231.25 g/mol, exact mass: 231.1235 u) may refer to:

 Dexfenfluramine, an anoretic drug
 Fenfluramine
 Levofenfluramine